Lone Wolf v. Hitchcock, 187 U.S. 553 (1903), was a United States Supreme Court case brought against the US government by the Kiowa chief Lone Wolf, who charged that Native American tribes under the Medicine Lodge Treaty had been defrauded of land by Congressional actions in violation of the treaty.

The Court declared that the "plenary power" of the United States Congress gave it authority to abrogate treaty obligations between the United States and Native American tribes unilaterally. The decision marked a departure from the holdings of Cherokee Nation v. Georgia, and Worcester v. Georgia, which had shown greater respect for the autonomy of Native American tribes.

Background

Tribes

The Kiowa tribe is a Native American tribe that has historically inhabited the southern Great Plains what is now Oklahoma, Texas, Kansas, and New Mexico. Originally from the northern great plains along the Platte River, and under pressure from other tribes, they eventually moved and settled south of the Arkansas River primarily in present-day Oklahoma. The Kiowa had a long history of close association and alliance with the Kiowa-Apache or Plains Apache. Around 1790, the Kiowa also formed an alliance with the Comanche and formed a barrier to European-American incursions into their territories. The alliance made travel on the Santa Fe Trail hazardous, with attacks on wagon trains beginning in 1828 and continuing thereafter.

Treaties

In 1837 at Fort Gibson, leaders of the Kiowa tribe signed their first treaty with the United States. By 1854, the need for another treaty became apparent, and the United States entered into a treaty with the Kiowa, Comanche, and Kiowa-Apache (KCA) at Fort Ackinson, Indian Territory. The treaty did not specifically designate a reservation but was, for the most part, an extension of the 1837 treaty. There was an attempt to place some of the tribes on a reservation on the Brazos River in Texas near Fort Belknap, under Indian Agent Robert S. Neighbors. By 1858, Neighbors resolved to move the reservation into Indian Territory. By August 1859, Neighbors had moved the Indians from the Brazos Reservation to Indian Territory, south of the Washita River near Fort Cobb. In 1865, near present-day Wichita, Kansas, the three tribes signed another treaty that provided for the reservation in present-day Oklahoma and Texas. Finally, in 1867, the tribes agreed to the Medicine Lodge Treaty. The treaty provided for a much smaller reservation and stipulated that whites were not allowed to encroach on the reservation. Also, to reduce the reserve's land further would require the approval of three fourths of the tribal members.

Assimilation period

Within one year, the United States breached the treaty when General William T. Sherman ordered all the tribes to Fort Cobb, withheld the treaty payments to them, and requested an order declaring that all hunting rights be forfeited. At the same time, Indian agents were trying to undermine tribal authority as the buffalo herds were being eliminated by white hunting. Two new leaders emerged meanwhile: Quanah Parker and Lone Wolf (the younger) Following his defeat at the Battle of Palo Duro Canyon, Parker settled down and began to adopt white ways. Lone Wolf and his followers continued to resist assimilation policies. Many of the old tribal leaders had been arrested and imprisoned when they left the reservation to hunt, and war leaders such as Lone Wolf (the elder) started to pass away from old age and disease.

During this same period, as the tribes had been unsuccessful at farming it, the KCA found a way to make the land pay by leasing it to cattlemen for grazing. At the same time, whites living just outside the reservation boundary were coming onto it to take timber and other goods, resulting in the tribes forming a police force to protect their property from theft by white settlers.

The Jerome Commission

In 1892, the United States sent the Jerome Commission, consisting of David H. Jerome, Alfred M. Wilson, and Warren G. Sayre, to meet with the Kiowa to convince them to turn over most of their reserve for white settlement in return for $2 million. Lone Wolf spoke out in opposition to the allotment, saying:

After over a week of negotiations, terms were set so that each member would receive 160 acres. The tribes would receive $2 million of which $250,000 would be paid to members, with the remaining money to be held in trust for the tribes at 5% interest. The commission immediately began to collect signatures and, just as quickly, allegations of fraud arose. Joshua Givens, an interpreter, was widely suspected of being dishonest. He was accused of forcing some members to sign and tricking others into thinking they were signing a document opposing the agreement. By now, the tribes were almost unanimous in their opposition to the agreement, asked to see the document, and requested that their signatures be removed. Lone Wolf later stated that was refused and that they were threatened with violence. Jerome left the reservation with what the government claimed was the approval of three quarters of the tribe.

Congress
With the validity of the agreement in question, the tribes, joined by the Indian Rights Association (IRA) and local ranchers, lobbied against its ratification by Congress. The IRA wrote letters to Senators, stating that the agreement was: "utterly destructive of that honor and good faith which should characterize our dealings with any people, and especially with one too weak to enforce their rights as against us by any other mean as than an appeal to our sense of justice." The Secretary of the Interior informed Congress that the allotment would be devastating to the tribes, as the land was not suited to farming, and the amount of land allotted would not allow them sufficient land to graze cattle. A bill was introduced in 1892 to ratify the agreement, but failed to receive the necessary votes. It was reintroduced every year until it passed in 1900, eight years later. The agreement finally passed when the Rock Island Railroad agree to set aside an additional 480,000 acres of pastureland for the tribes to hold in common.

Lower courts
At the ratification of the agreement, a delegation of tribal leaders traveled to Washington, D.C. and requested a meeting with President William McKinley. McKinley's position was that the tribes must conform to the decision of Congress. Parker and the other principal chiefs accepted that the fight against allotment was over, but Lone Wolf continued to argue against accepting allotment. In 1901, Lone Wolf and others hired William M. Springer, a former federal judge and US representative.

Supreme Court of the District of Columbia
On June 6, 1901, Springer filed suit in the Supreme Court of the District of Columbia, which is a different court than the United States Supreme Court. The plaintiffs asked for an injunction to stop the opening of KCA lands to settlement and the allotment of the land. Springer argued that the Jerome agreement deprived the tribes of their lands without due process and in violation of the Constitution by breaking the treaty with the tribes. Springer alleged that the KCA were duped into signing the agreement and that it was not signed by three quarters of the members, as required by the treaty, that the KCA had protested the agreement from the beginning, and that the version which Congress ratified was different from the version signed by the KCA. While the suit was being heard, on August 6, 1901, the government began to sell off the tribes' surplus land. Judge A.C. Bradley ruled against Lone Wolf, holding that Congress had the authority to allot the land, citing United States v. Kagama.

Circuit Court of Appeals
Springer then appealed to the D.C. Circuit Court of Appeals. By the time that court heard the appeal, the reservation land had been allotted and excess land sold. The D.C. Circuit ruled that the question was not justiciable, rather it was a political question which had to be decided by Congress. The Court held that an act of Congress must prevail over any specific article in a treaty with an Indian tribe. The court further held that, in any event, the land did not belong to the tribe. It was controlled by the United States, with Indians as mere occupants. The Circuit Court affirmed the decision of the lower court.

Supreme Court

Arguments
At this point, the IRA hired another attorney, Hampton L. Carson, to take the lead from Springer. The arguments remained the same as they had in the lower courts: that the tribes were being deprived of their land without due process. The attorneys noted that the United States had never deprived a tribe of its land without some form of consent by the tribe. Carson and Springer highlighted Worcester v. Georgia and the Indian canon of construction in their arguments.

Willis Van Devanter argued the case for the United States, taking the position that Congress had the power to abrogate the treaty at will. Devanter cited Kagama as authority for Congress having plenary power over Indian matters.

Opinion of the court
Justice Edward White delivered the opinion of the unanimous court. The Court held that Congress had the authority to void treaty obligations with Native American tribes because it had an inherent plenary power, noting:

The decision was based, among other things, on a paternalistic view of the United States' relationship with the tribes:

The decision presented American Indians as inferior in race, culture, and religion: 

White held that requiring tribal consent would actually hurt the tribes and that the tribes should presume that Congress would act in good faith to protect tribal needs.

Justice John Marshall Harlan concurred in the judgment but did not author a separate opinion.

Subsequent developments
Reports show that ninety percent of the land allotted to tribal members was lost by them to settlers. By the 1920s, the KCA tribes were impoverished, with an unemployment rate of sixty percent.

Until the Meriam Report was published, showing the destructive effects of the policy, the allotment process continued unchecked. Also, the Court's ruling meant that the only recourse left for Indian tribes to use to resolve land disputes was Congress. Indians were not eligible to bring a case in the United States Court of Claims under the Tucker Act, and were limited to actions in often hostile state courts.

Legally, scholars have compared Lone Wolf to the infamous Dred Scott case, and universally condemned the decision.

See also
 List of United States Supreme Court cases, volume 187

Footnotes

References

Further reading

External links
 
 

1903 in United States case law
United States Native American treaty case law
Race and law in the United States
United States Supreme Court cases
United States Supreme Court cases of the Fuller Court
Indigenous peoples of the Great Plains
Kiowa
Indian Territory